The Pratt & Whitney R-1830 Twin Wasp is an American air-cooled radial aircraft engine. It displaces  and its bore and stroke are both . The design traces its history to 1929 experiments at Pratt & Whitney on twin-row designs. Production began in 1932 and it was widely used during the 1930s.

It was selected as the power plant for both the four-engined Consolidated B-24 Liberator heavy bomber and the twin-engined Douglas DC-3 transport, two of the most-produced aircraft. The production run of 173,618 R-1830 examples makes it the most-produced aviation engine in history.

A further developed version, the R-2000, was produced starting in 1942. The primary user of the R-2000 was the Douglas DC-4.

Mostly retired today, the R-1830 is still used on Douglas DC-3 and various museum aircraft and warbirds seen at airshows. It is not manufactured anymore, but spares are still available and there is still a market for second-hand engines and parts.

Variants
 R-1830-1: 
 R-1830-9: , 
 R-1830-11: 
 R-1830-17: 
 R-1830-21: 
 R-1830-25: 
 R-1830-33: 
 R-1830-35:  Fitted with GE B-2 turbosupercharger
 R-1830-41:  Fitted with GE B-2 turbosupercharger
 R-1830-43: 
 R-1830-45: 
 R-1830-49: 
 R-1830-64: , 
 R-1830-65: 
 R-1830-72: 
 R-1830-75:  
 R-1830-76: 
 R-1830-82: 
 R-1830-86: 
 R-1830-88: 
 R-1830-90: 
 R-1830-90-B: 
 R-1830-92: 
 R-1830-94:  
 R-1830-S1C3-G: , 
 R-1830-S3C4-G: 
 R-1830-S6C3-G: 
 R-1830-SC-G: 
 R-1830-SC2-G: , 
 R-1830-SC3-G:  same engine built in Sweden as STWC-3G by SFA company for Swedish J 22, B 17 and B 18.

Applications 

 DAP Beaufort – Australian-built variants of Bristol Beaufort
 Bloch MB.176
 Boeing XB-15
 Budd RB Conestoga
 Burnelli CBY-3
 CAC Boomerang – Australian "emergency fighter"
 CAC Woomera
 Consolidated B-24 Liberator
 Consolidated PBY Catalina
 Consolidated PB2Y Coronado
 Consolidated PB4Y Privateer
 Curtiss P-36 Hawk
 Douglas C-47 Skytrain
 Douglas DC-3
 Douglas DB-7 – early variants only
 Douglas TBD Devastator
 FFVS J 22 – "emergency fighter"; built in-house by the Swedish Air Force
 Grumman F4F Wildcat
 I.Ae. 24 Calquin
 Laird-Turner Meteor LTR-14
 Lioré et Olivier LeO 453
 Lockheed Model 18 Lodestar
 Lisunov Li-3 – a Yugoslav version of the Lisunov Li-2
 Martin Maryland
 Martin M-130
 Republic P-43 Lancer
 Saab 17
 Saab 18
 Short Sunderland V
 Seversky P-35 – Finnish "emergency fighter" 
 Vickers Wellington IV
 VL Myrsky
 Vultee P-66 Vanguard

Engines on display
 Model R-1830-65 on display at the Museo Nacional de Aeronautica, Buenos Aires, Argentina
 Model R-1830-86 on display at the New England Air Museum, Bradley International Airport, Windsor Locks, Connecticut.
 Model R-1830-90C on display at the Dutch aviation museum Aviodrome
 Model R-1830-92 displayed at the Smithsonian Institution's National Air and Space Museum in Washington, DC
 Model R-1830 on display at the Northeast Classic Car Museum in Norwich, New York
 Model R-1830 cut-away display at Airbase Arizona Museum in Mesa, Arizona

Specifications (R-1830-S1C-G)

See also

References

Notes

Bibliography 
 

Gunston, Bill. World Encyclopedia of Aero Engines: From the Pioneers to the Present Day. 5th edition, Stroud, UK: Sutton, 2006.
White, Graham. Allied Aircraft Piston Engines of World War II: History and Development of Frontline Aircraft Piston Engines Produced by Great Britain and the United States During World War II. Warrendale, Pennsylvania: SAE International, 1995.

External links

 Pratt & Whitney's R-1830 page
 List of R-1830 Variants

Aircraft air-cooled radial piston engines
R-1830
1930s aircraft piston engines